Hannelore Glaser may refer to:

 Hannelore Glaser, the maiden name of Loki Schmidt
 Hannelore Glaser-Franke, a German former alpine skier